Celia de Molina Díaz (Linares, Jaén;  March 31, 1983) is a Spanish actress and screenwriter known for starring in the film Cómo sobrevivir a una despedida and for being the creator and host of the web series El antivlog.

Biography 
Celia de Molina was born on March 31st, 1983 in Linares, Jaén, but grew up in Granada. She is the daughter of Agustin de Molina Ortega and Emilia Diaz Quero. She is the older sister of the actress, Natalia de Molina. She has two older sisters, Isabel De Molina and Emilia De Molina. She graduated from the Escuela Superior de Arte Dramático de Sevilla y Málaga in 2007 and has taken several training courses, both in acting and in dance and singing.

Career 
She has developed most of her career as an actress in theater. In 2010, she created the theatrical space Garaje Lumière in Madrid, which she directed and played the role of stage programmer for three years.

Her television debut was with a small episodic role in the Canal Sur series Arrayán. We have also been able to see her in series such as Anclados , Yo quisiera and Cuerpo de Élite with episodic characters. In 2018, she appeared as a secondary in the series Lontano da te, which is currently in post-production and can be seen in Italy and Spain, and stars Megan Montaner, Pepón Nieto and Rosario Pardo, among others.

In the cinema, she has had several incursions as a supporting actress. Her big break came in 2015 when she starred in the film Cómo sobrevivir a una despedida  by director Manuela Burló Moreno. She appeared in that film alongside her sister Natalia de Molina, Úrsula Corberó, Brays Efe and María Hervás.

In 2016, she created and starred in the webseries El Antivlog, which can be seen through the platform Flooxer. It is a humorous critique of the vlogger world.

In 2017, she started working on the comedy Late Motiv, directed by Andreu Buenafuente and broadcast on the pay channel #0. Also in that year, she was in the second season of the comedy show El fin de la comedia, which was led by Ignatius Farray.

She is currently developing what will be her first feature film as screenwriter and director, No es universal at the Film Academy Residencies.

Filmography

Feature films

Television

Television programs

Personal life 
She is in a relationship with Italian Francesco Pozzi with whom she has a son.

References 

Spanish television actresses
Spanish film actresses
21st-century Spanish actresses
Living people
1983 births
Actresses from Andalusia